The Upper Charles River Reservation is a Massachusetts state park encompassing portions of the banks of the Charles River between the Watertown Dam in Watertown and Riverdale Park in Dedham and the West Roxbury neighborhood of Boston. The park is managed by the Massachusetts Department of Conservation and Recreation. It includes land in the communities of Watertown, Waltham, Newton, Weston, Wellesley, Needham, Dedham, and Boston. Some of the Charles River Reservation Parkways also fall within the park boundaries.  The Charles River Bike Path follows the river through much of the reservation.

Parks and attractions
The following parks and other attractions are along the river between Watertown and Dedham:

Charles River Museum of Industry & Innovation
Mount Feake Cemetery
Auburndale Park and Flowed Meadow
Norumbega Park
Weston Ski Track
Hemlock Gorge Reservation, including Echo Bridge
Nahanton Park
Cutler Park
Brook Farm
Millennium Park
Riverdale Park

See also
Charles River Reservation

References

External links
Upper Charles River Reservation Department of Conservation and Recreation
Upper Charles West Map Department of Conservation and Recreation
Upper Charles East Map Department of Conservation and Recreation

State parks of Massachusetts
Massachusetts natural resources
Charles River
Parks in Middlesex County, Massachusetts
Parks in Norfolk County, Massachusetts
Parks in Suffolk County, Massachusetts
Parks in Boston
Parks in Dedham, Massachusetts